Capital punishment in Nepal has been abolished.

For crimes under the country's common law, capital punishment was abolished by legal reform in 1946. It was later reinstated for murder and terrorism in 1985. Full abolition by constitutional amendment came into force on 9 November 1991.

Article 12 of the Constitution of the Kingdom of Nepal (1990) states: "No law shall be made which provides for capital punishment."

The last execution in Nepal took place in 1979.

Reasons for abolition 

According to a study by Cornell Law School, one of the key factors leading to the abolition was a 15-year period of monitored experimental abolition, which involved a moratorium on executions for common law offenses, during which crime rates remained stable, reassured the public and paved the way for abolition for ordinary crimes in 1946.

The study also notes that the transition to a multi-party constitutional monarchy, in 1990, "provided a propitious context for abolition", seen as part of a broad program of human rights reform aimed at breaking with the past.

References

Nepal
Human rights in Nepal